Navjit Singh (born 1 July 1991), known as Navjit is an Indian volleyball player.

Early life 

Navjit Singh was born on 1 July 1991 is from Rampur Near Nurmahal, Teh. Phillaur, Dist. Jalandhar, Punjab, India.

References

Living people
Sportspeople from Punjab, India
Indian men's volleyball players
Volleyball players at the 2010 Asian Games
Volleyball players at the 2014 Asian Games
1991 births
Asian Games competitors for India